Yanel Andriana Pinto Pérez (born 20 May 1989 in Maracay) is an Olympic swimmer from Venezuela. She swam for Venezuela at the 2008 Olympics.

She also swam at the:
2012 Olympics
2007 World Championships
2007 Pan American Games
2008 Open Water Worlds
2009 World Championships
2010 Central American and Caribbean Games

At the 2009 World Championships, she was part of the team that swam to a new Venezuelan Record in the 4x200 Free Relay.

References

External links
 
 
 

Living people
1989 births
Female long-distance swimmers
Sportspeople from Maracay
Venezuelan female swimmers
Olympic swimmers of Venezuela
Swimmers at the 2007 Pan American Games
Swimmers at the 2008 Summer Olympics
Swimmers at the 2011 Pan American Games
Swimmers at the 2012 Summer Olympics
Pan American Games bronze medalists for Venezuela
Pan American Games medalists in swimming
Central American and Caribbean Games gold medalists for Venezuela
Central American and Caribbean Games silver medalists for Venezuela
South American Games silver medalists for Venezuela
South American Games bronze medalists for Venezuela
South American Games medalists in swimming
Competitors at the 2006 South American Games
Competitors at the 2006 Central American and Caribbean Games
Competitors at the 2010 Central American and Caribbean Games
Central American and Caribbean Games medalists in swimming
Medalists at the 2007 Pan American Games
21st-century Venezuelan women